Robert W. Bolyard (December 4, 1920 – May 21, 2009) was an American professional basketball player. He played for the Anderson Duffey Packers and Sheboygan Red Skins in the National Basketball League and averaged 4.3 points per game.

References

1920 births
2009 deaths
American men's basketball players
United States Army personnel of World War II
Anderson Packers players
Basketball players from Fort Wayne, Indiana
Forwards (basketball)
Guards (basketball)
Sheboygan Red Skins players
Toledo Rockets men's basketball players
Washington Generals players